The Aston Martin Le Mans was a two or four seat sports car made by Aston Martin between 1932 and 1934.

Twin Horizontal SU carburettors were fitted. The aluminium body was mounted on a separate steel chassis which had beam axles front and rear with semi-elliptic leaf springs. 4-Wheel drum brakes, mechanically operated at the rear, and by cable at the front were used.

During 1932 the Aston Martin International Le Mans had slowly sold at £650; the 1933 Aston Martin Le Mans model retailed at £595, thereby increasing the chance of the car selling faster.

Aston Martin, encouraged by the car's reception, began to offer alternative wheelbase lengths: 102 inches/2591 mm or 120 inches/3048 mm and a choice of open two-seater or four-seater bodywork. The cars were long, low and immediately recognisable by their unique radiator style and had great character making all the appropriate mechanical noises that characterised Aston Martin. Aston Martin made the cars exclusive; between 1932 and 1933, only 130 were produced.

According to the standards of the early 1930s, Aston Le Mans were speedy cars – compared to the pace of the MG and Singer- with a top speed in the region of 85 mph (137 km/h) and acceleration from 0–50 mph (0–80 km/h) in 16 seconds.

References

Le Mans
1930s cars